The men's 200 metre freestyle competition at the 2018 Pan Pacific Swimming Championships took place on August 9 at the Tokyo Tatsumi International Swimming Center. The defending champion was Thomas Fraser-Holmes of Australia.

Records
Prior to this competition, the existing world and Pan Pacific records were as follows:

Results
All times are in minutes and seconds.

Heats
The first round was held on 9 August from 10:00.

Only two swimmers from each country may advance to the A or B final. If a country not qualify any swimmer to the A final, that same country may qualify up to three swimmers to the B final.

B Final 
The B final was held on 9 August from 17:30.

A Final 
The A final was held on 9 August from 17:30.

References

2018 Pan Pacific Swimming Championships